Sneak Attack is an album released in 1981 by the Buddy Miles Regiment, a band headed by American rock guitarist and drummer Buddy Miles. The album was released as an 11-track two-LP vinyl set, and includes tracks that were recorded live at the CIM prison facility in Chino, California. It was co-produced by Jim Paris and recorded and mastered at three different recording studios in Los Angeles, California, including the live show at Chino State Prison where Miles formed an all-inmate band while serving time there.

Track listing
All tracks composed by Buddy Miles; except where indicated

Record one:
"Latin Rock Fusion" 6:55 
"Can You Hold Me" 5:37
"Sunshine of Your Love" 5:42 (Jack Bruce, Peter Brown, Eric Clapton)
"I've Made My Mind Up" 7:42
"Working Hard Every Day" 10:35

Record two: 
"Colossus" 4:56
"Let's Make It Together" 8:13
"Jazz Fusion" 4:30
"Hold Her Tight"
"Dust in the Wind" (Kerry Livgren)
"For Your Precious Love" (Arthur H. Brooks, Jerry Butler, Richard A. Brooks)

References

Buddy Miles albums
1981 albums
Atlantic Records albums